Foster Township is the name of some places in the U.S. state of Pennsylvania:
Foster Township, Luzerne County, Pennsylvania
Foster Township, McKean County, Pennsylvania
Foster Township, Schuylkill County, Pennsylvania

Pennsylvania township disambiguation pages